In mathematics, tiny and miny are operators that yield infinitesimal values when applied to numbers in combinatorial game theory. Given a positive number G, tiny G (denoted by ⧾G in many texts) is equal to {0|{0|-G}} for any game G, whereas miny G (analogously denoted ⧿G) is tiny G's negative, or {{G|0}|0}.

Tiny and miny aren't just abstract mathematical operators on combinatorial games: tiny and miny games do occur "naturally" in such games as toppling dominoes. Specifically, tiny n, where n is a natural number, can be generated by placing two black dominoes outside n + 2 white dominoes.

Tiny games and up have certain curious relational characteristics. Specifically, though ⧾G is infinitesimal with respect to ↑ for all positive values of x, ⧾⧾⧾G is equal to up. Expansion of ⧾⧾⧾G into its canonical form yields {0|{{0|{{0|{0|-G}}|0}}|0}}. While the expression appears daunting, some careful and persistent expansion of the game tree of ⧾⧾⧾G + ↓ will show that it is a second player win, and that, consequently, ⧾⧾⧾G = ↑. Similarly curious, mathematician John Horton Conway noted, calling it "amusing," that "↑ is the unique solution of ⧾G = G." Conway's assertion is also easily verifiable with canonical forms and game trees.

References 

 
 

Combinatorial game theory